Neils is a surname. Notable people with the surname include:

 Jenifer Neils (born 1950), American archaeologist
 Steve Neils (born 1951), American American football player

See also
 Neil

Surnames of German origin